Cytosine glycols are intermediate unstable products of cytosine oxidation. These, in turn, are thought to undergo deamination to uracil glycol, dehydration to 5-hydroxycytosine, or both deamination and dehydration to 5-hydroxyuracil.

The lifetime of cytosine glycols are enhanced in double-stranded DNA compared to the free nucleoside.

References

Vicinal diols